Isidore Singer (10 November 1859 – 20 February 1939) was an American encyclopedist and editor of The Jewish Encyclopedia and founder of the American League for the Rights of Man.

Biography 
Singer was born in 1859 in Weisskirchen, Moravia, in the Austrian Empire. He studied at the University of Vienna and the Humboldt University of Berlin, receiving his Ph.D. in 1884.

France 
After editing the Allgemeine oesterreichische Literaturzeitung (Austrian literary newspaper) from 1885 to 1886, he became literary secretary to the French ambassador in Vienna. From 1887, he worked in Paris in the press bureau of the French foreign office and was active in the campaign on behalf of Alfred Dreyfus. In 1893 he founded a short-lived biweekly called La Vraie Parole as a foil to the anti-Jewish La Libre Parole.

New York 
Singer moved to New York City in 1895 where he learned English and taught French, raising the money for the Jewish Encyclopedia he had envisioned.

Over the course of his career, Singer also proposed many projects which never won backing, including a multi-million-dollar loan to aid the Jews of Eastern Europe, a Jewish university open to students of any background, various encyclopedias about secular topics, and a 25-volume publication series of Hebrew classics. By 1911, the date of this latter proposal, "neither the [Jewish] Publication Society nor any body of respectable scholars would work with him," according to encyclopedist Cyrus Adler.

Religious views 
Singer held extremely liberal views which at times proved unpopular. He endorsed Jesus and the Christian New Testament and proposed a Hebrew translation. He founded the Amos Society to promote understanding among followers of monotheistic religions.

His 1897 prospectus for the encyclopedia project called for harmony between religions; called the Sabbath and holidays "heavy burdens, or, at best, mere ceremonies" for most Jews; and made the radical suggestion that Jewish parents, if honest with their children, would tell them:

Due to the controversy of Singer's outlooks, his publisher, Funk & Wagnalls, agreed to the encyclopedia project only after divesting Singer of editorial control and appointing a board of prestigious Jewish scholars, including rabbis.

He died in 1939 in New York City.

Publications 
 Russia at the Bar of the American People: A Memoir of Kinship.  Funk & Wagnalls, 1904.
 The German Classics (1913–1914), with Kuno Francke: twenty volumes.
 A Religion of Truth, Justice, and Peace: A Challenge to Church and Synagogue to Lead in the Realization of the Social and Peace Gospel of the Hebrew Prophets. Amos Society: 1924.

References

Citations

Sources 

 Schwartz, S. R. The Emergence of Jewish Scholarship in America: The Publication of the Jewish Encyclopedia. '' Monographs of the Hebrew Union College, Number 13. Cincinnati: Hebrew Union College Press, 1991. .
 

1859 births
1939 deaths
American encyclopedists
American people of Austrian-Jewish descent
American people of Czech-Jewish descent
Austrian Jews
Austro-Hungarian emigrants to the United States
Jewish American writers
Jews and Judaism in New York City
People from Hranice (Přerov District)
University of Vienna alumni
Humboldt University of Berlin alumni
Jewish encyclopedists
Moravian Jews